Home Time is a British television comedy-drama written by and starring Emma Fryer with Neil Edmond co-writing. The first series ran between 14 September and 22 October 2009 on BBC Two.

Production
Home Time is set and filmed in Coventry, England.

Plot

Series 1 (2009)
Gaynor Jacks has come home. Home to Coventry, home to her mum and dad's house, home to the three best friends who called her mad for ever leaving. At the age of 17, she ran off to find her place in the big wide world, but now she's back - at 29 - with her tail between her legs and not so much as a starter home to show for her troubles. Gaynor can't hide forever in her tiny time-capsule bedroom with its Trainspotting poster peeling above the single bed and Wonderwall still paused on the CD player. She must crawl back into the life she left behind, suffering the gleeful sympathy of her friends and ill-judged parental intrusions, all played out in front of old flames and adversaries she thought she'd never see again, and underscored by smirking cries of 'See you're back then'.

Cast and characters

Emma Fryer portrays Gaynor Jacks, Gaynor can't hide forever, but a faint smile and a talent for fibbing are her only defences against the gleeful sympathy of her friends. It's like they kept her seat warm, knowing she'd be back. It doesn't matter what she's achieved down south, or how she's changed - if her Mum and friends have their way, she'll be exactly what she used to be: 17 all over again.
Hayley Jayne Standing portrays Mel Wedglake, As Gaynor's best friend, Mel knows best. She's never left the West Midlands, lives by choice at her parents' house and still makes her living through babysitting, but why should that disqualify her from doling out advice? She's read Marie Claire. Plus, by relentlessly advising others she doesn't have to look at her own failings. Mel will look you sweetly in the eye while pulling you to pieces. After all, if it's for your own good, it's not cruelty, is it? She's also a romantic, of sorts, and wants to be seen as the embodiment of maternal warmth.
Kerry Godliman portrays Becky Hogg, The go-getter. The long hours have finally paid off. With her commission-winning catch phrase "Cladding's Back" she's now Head of Marketing at CovConClad (Coventry's leading conservatories and cladding company). Becky is a massive fish in a pokey pond and wants the lifestyle to match, even if she can't afford it. This provincial player can never admit that she's desperately scrimping for the rent on her tiny apartment. She's doggedly pragmatic and straight-talking so vulnerability, affection and gratitude only ever leak out of her in grunts and punches.
Rebekah Staton portrays Kelly Langley, Kelly is the bouncy one of the group. A still-aspiring DJ, Kelly's been caning it hard in Cov since she was 15. Still wild, still clubbing, still unable to persuade any club owner to let her have any more than a 30-minute set, Kelly's idiotic vigour is undiminished and her daft clothes, demeanour and buoyant physique contrast with her craggy fun-worn face. Kelly's beauty's faded at the same rate as her eyesight, so she doesn't see the creases: she's pretty sure she's 22, give or take a couple of years.
Marian McLoughlin portrays Brenda Jacks, Gaynor's mum Brenda is by turns suffocating fond and sourly judgemental - she can't quite forgive her daughter for running away and making her look like a bad mum. She hides her resentment under energetic martyrdom and, though she dearly wants Gaynor to stay, they can't help but pick up where they left off: frustrated mother and sulking teen. In the 12 years she's been denied the role of mother, Brenda has overplayed a number of other roles, the latest being a 'befriender' at the local Irish centre, accent and all.
Philip Jackson portrays Roy Jacks, Gaynor's dad Roy is delighted to have her back home, but has no idea how to make her feel better. He does his best to mediate and reassure, despite his generation's lack of tools for the job - words don't come easy to Roy, but he's brave enough to keep trying. Gentle, cumbersome and big-handed, this practical man has found nothing to do since he was made redundant from his supervisory position on the factory floor at the car plant. His mild contentment contains a shred of unfocused longing.

Episodes

Series One (2009)

Reception
Home Time received a positive critical response, The Guardian describing it as "a brilliant, sophisticated, low-key show" and "as smart and original as it is sad and funny", The Mirror as an "understated, subtle and very clever comedy", Heat as "The best new comedy on the BBC for a long time" and the Financial Times felt that it "attained the same balance of tenderness and acuity that has characterised so many of the greatest British sitcoms, from Porridge to The Office".

Home Time was also nominated for Best Sitcom at both the 2010 South Bank Show Awards and The Rose D'Or.

DVD release
Home Time Was Released on DVD on 22 August 2011.

References

External links

Home Time: Press Pack

BBC television sitcoms
2000s British comedy-drama television series
2009 British television series debuts
2009 British television series endings
British comedy-drama television shows
Television shows set in the West Midlands (county)
English-language television shows